Babrungas may refer to places in Lithuania:

Babrungas, a village in the Plungė district municipality
Babrungas eldership, an administrative eldership
Babrungas River, a river